Liber fundationis may refer to:

Liber fundationis claustri Sanctae Mariae Virginis in Heinrichow or Book of Henryków
Liber fundationis episcopatus Vratislaviensis